Vyacheslav Matveyevich Tkachov was a Russian general and writer.

In 1913 Tkachov became military pilot of Imperial Russian Air Service.

In 1914, the Russian pilot Lt. Vyacheslav Tkachov became the very first Russian pilot who shot down enemy aircraft with handgun. He attacked German "Albatros" and shot the enemy pilot

Later, Tkachov took part in Russian Civil War.

Honours and awards 
 Order of Saint Stanislaus (May 1910)
 Order of St. Anna of the Third Class (February 1913)
 Order of St. Vladimir of the Fourth Class (February 1915)
 Order of St. George of the Fourth Degree (July 1916)
 Gold Sword for Bravery (September 1916)
 Distinguished Service Order (United Kingdom)

References

Sources 
Blume, August. The Russian Military Air Fleet in World War I, Volume One. (Schiffer Publishing, 2010). , 978-0764333514.
 — The Russian Military Air Fleet in World War I, Volume Two. (Schiffer Publishing, 2010) , 9780764333521.
 А.В. Махалин. М. Ткачёв — участник и историк воздушных сражений Великой войны // Первая мировая война и участие в ней России. Часть II. М., 1994.

1885 births
1965 deaths
People from Giaginsky District
People from Kuban Oblast
Russian generals
Aviators from the Russian Empire
Imperial Russian Air Force personnel
Writers from the Russian Empire
Recipients of the Order of Saint Stanislaus (Russian), 2nd class
Recipients of the Order of St. Anna, 3rd class
Companions of the Distinguished Service Order
Recipients of the Gold Sword for Bravery